David Dostal (born August 27, 1973) is a Czech-born French former professional ice hockey right winger.

Born in Opava, Czechoslovakia, Dostal began his career with his hometown HC Slezan Opava and played six games in the Czech Extraliga for the team during the 1996–97 season. He then spent a season with HK Spišská Nová Ves in Slovakia before joining French side Anglet Hormadi Élite in 1998. He spent seven seasons with Anglet, during which he became a French citizen and began playing for the French national team in 2003. He played for France in the 2004 World Ice Hockey Championship.

Dostal moved in Denmark in 2005, signing for EfB Ishockey. He remained for two seasons before returning to France in 2007, playing in the French lower leagues for the remainder of his career.

References

External links

1973 births
Living people
Anglet Hormadi Élite players
Czech ice hockey right wingers
Drakkars de Caen players
EfB Ishockey players
French ice hockey right wingers
HC Slezan Opava players
HK Spišská Nová Ves players
Sportspeople from Opava
Czech expatriate sportspeople in France
Czech expatriate sportspeople in Denmark
Expatriate ice hockey players in Denmark
Expatriate ice hockey players in France
Czech expatriate ice hockey players in Slovakia
Naturalized citizens of France